Janice Eidus, is an American writer living in New York City. Her novels include The War of the Rosens, The Last Jewish Virgin and Urban Bliss. She has  twice won the O.Henry Prize for Fiction, as well as a Pushcart Prize. Other awards include the Redbook Short Fiction Contest, The Acker Award for Achievement, an Independent Book Award, and The Firecracker Award given by the Community of Literary Magazines & Presses. 

Eidus' work has been praised by critics.

Eidus has taught at such universities as Morningside College, Carlow University, the University of New Orleans, and The New School and at numerous writers' conferences, including The Writers Workshop of San Miguel de Allende, Mexico, Sanibel Island Writers Conference, and the Chautauqua Writers Conference.

See also

 Lists of American writers
 List of Johns Hopkins University people
 List of people from the Bronx

References

External links
 Janice Eidus's home page
 
 New York Times essay, "The Wander"
 Review of War of the Rosens on Jewish Literary Review

Place of birth missing (living people)
20th-century American women writers
20th-century American non-fiction writers
21st-century American women writers
Johns Hopkins University alumni
Jewish American writers
Living people
People from the Bronx
American women non-fiction writers
21st-century American non-fiction writers
Year of birth missing (living people)
21st-century American Jews